Nu jazz (also known as jazztronica, or future jazz) is a genre of jazz and electronic music. The music blends jazz elements with other musical styles, such as funk, electronic music, and free improvisation.

Overview
Nu jazz typically ventures further into the electronic territory than does its close cousin, acid jazz. Nu jazz can be very experimental in nature and can vary widely in sound and concept. The sound departs further from its blues roots than acid jazz does, and instead explores electronic sounds and ethereal jazz sensualities. "The star of Nu jazz is the music itself and not the individual dexterity of the musicians."

See also 
 Broken beat
 Groovera New Modern Radio
 Saint-Germain-des-Prés Café (popular series of nu-jazz compilations)
 Chillout

References

Sources 
 "A Flourish of Jazz", Time Magazine article, including mention of the use of electronics in jazz fusion.

 
Jazz genres
Electronic music genres
Fusion music genres